Max Wolff Filho (July 29, 1912 – April 12, 1945) was a Brazilian Army sergeant, a member of the Brazilian Expeditionary Force who fought in Italy in World War II.

Max Wolff was born in Rio Negro, Paraná, Brazil. He enlisted in 1930 in the city of Curitiba, joining the 15th Hunters Battalion. He served in the Revolution of 1930 and the Constitutionalist Revolution against the Paulistas. During World War II, he was a member of the Brazilian Expeditionary Force, under the command of the US 5th Army. He arrived in Italy in September 1944 and led over 30 patrols.

A few days before his death, Wolff was awarded the US Bronze Star by General Lucian Truscott. First Sergeant Max Wolff died from German machine-gun fire in Riva de Biscaia, near Montese, during a reconnaissance patrol. At the time of his death, Wolff was already a widower and left a 10-year-old daughter. He was posthumously promoted to Second Lieutenant for his bravery.

Medals and awards
 Combat Cross First Class (Brazilian)
 War Medal (Brazilian)
 Campaign Medal (Brazilian)
 Sangue do Brasil (Blood of Brazil)
  Bronze Star (US)

References

External links
EsSA Max Wolff Filho (Portuguese)
Governo do Paraná (Portuguese)

1912 births
1945 deaths
Brazilian people of German descent
Brazilian military personnel of World War II
Brazilian military personnel killed in World War II
20th-century Brazilian military personnel